South Korea (IOC designation:Korea) participated in the 1986 Asian Games held in Seoul, South Korea from September 20, 1986 to October 5, 1986.

Medal summary

Medal table

Medalists

References

Korea, South
1986
Asian Games